Mīrzā Najaf Khān Bahādur, simply known as Najaf Khan (b. 1723 – 26 April 1782 d.) was an adventurer of Safavid lineage who came to Delhi around 1740 from Iran after Nader Shah had displaced Safavid dynasty in 1736. He became a courtier of Mughal emperor Shah Alam II (17401782). He married his sister into the family of the Shia Nawab of Awadh, which resulted in him gaining the title of Deputy Wazir of Awadh. He served during the Battle of Buxar, and he was the highest commander of the Mughal army from 1772 till his death in April 1782.

Career
He was more successful than his predecessor Najib ad-Dawlah, the Rohilla Afghan appointed by Ahmad Shah Durrani to protect the Mughal throne. He had an adopted son Najaf Quli Khan, a convert who was born as a Hindu (not the same as Quli Khan buried in Mehrauli Archaeological Park). After his death there was a dispute about his possessions as he left no child, his widow sister requested emperor for her adopted son on Mirza's position of deputy wazir but this claim was rivaled by Mirza Shafi Khan who had a great army and considerable resources in the Mughal court, Mirza was also the closest of relatives to Najaf. Najaf Khan's rival in court of Shah Alam was Nawab Majad-ud-Daulah who used to get the Sikh misls to cause panic among the Mughals to continuously keep Najaf Khan's forces busy. He is also credited for renaming the city of Aligarh, formerly known as Kol.

Death
He died on April 26, 1782 after serving Mughal throne for forty two years. 

He started to suffer long bouts of fever and illness immediately after as he was appointed Vakil-i-Mutlaq or regent of Mughals in 1779 at the age of 42. Court rumors had started against the rise of this Shia courtier. Kahir-ud-Din Illahabadi wrote in Ibratnama that Najaf Khan became close to eunuch Latafat Ali Khan who regularly supplied Najaf Khan with wine and dancing girls. Najaf became obsessed with an experienced prostitute introduced by Latafat. Nafaj spent much of his time in wining in the presence of this prostitute, until he fell seriously sick, feverish and weak to the extent "it could no longer be cured treated". In reality his time in sickness was spent in "pain and suffering, spitting blood".

Tomb of Mirza Najaf Khan"Mirza Najaf Khan's Tomb"''' near Safdarjung Airport lies closer to the Tomb of Safdarjung in the Lodhi Gardens.It is an uncompleted tomb. Set in a lush modern landscaped garden, this tomb is inside an enclosed boundary. There is a beautifully ruined entrance to the tomb complex set at a distance from the base platform of the tomb. In the middle of the area enclosed by the boundary, lies a large and beautiful square red stone platform with another smaller platform on top with a flat roof and no dome. Inscription marked grave of Mirza Najaf Khan and his daughter, Fatima (died 1820 CE), are inside two marble cenotaphs.

Gallery

See also
Mirza Ismail Beg, kinsman
Najafgarh town, Delhi, India.

References 

Mughal nobility
Indian military leaders
18th-century Indian people
1733 births
1782 deaths